16th Army may refer to:

 16th Army (Wehrmacht), a unit of the German Army in World War II
 16th Army (RSFSR), a unit of the Red Army during the Russian Civil War
 16th Army (Soviet Union). a unit of the Soviet Army during World War II
 Western Army (Russia) (16th Soviet Army), a unit of the Soviet Army during World War II
 16th Army (People's Republic of China), a currently-existing unit of People's Republic of China
 Sixteenth Army (Japan), a unit of the Imperial Japanese Army

See also
 16th Wing (disambiguation)
 16th Group (disambiguation)
 16th Division (disambiguation)
 16th Brigade (disambiguation)
 16th Regiment (disambiguation)
 16th Squadron (disambiguation)